Bunkure is a Local Government Area in Kano State, Nigeria. Its headquarters are in the town of Bunkure.

It has an area of 487 km and a population of 170,891 at the 2006 census.

The postal code of the area is 710.

References

Historical Background of Bunkure Local Government Kano State.
    Here the certain the historical background of area of the study. 
  
Bunkure local government as well geographical location size culture and economy, Bunkure local government was originated/ established in 1989 by the (Ibrahim Badamasi Babangida) Banagida military regime. It was situated in the Southern earthen of Kano state with a population of over 284,251.the head quarter f the local government was sited in Bunkure town with a distance of about 45 km form Kano it covers an area of about 4325 square km, it was bordered in the south by Rano local government, in the north Kura local government and the easted by Dawakin Kudu local government, Wudil and Garko local government respectively while in the west bordered with Garun-Malam local government. 
History and Culture 
   
Bunkure local government was split from the defunct of Rano local government under the (Ibrahim Badamasi Babangida) policy new local government creation which is aimed at bringing people closer to government.
1.	Alhaji Isah Amadu 			-	from		1989-1999
2.	Alhaji Ado Isah Wakili			-	from		1999-2002
3.	Alhaji Tafida Abubakar Ila		-	from		2002-2007
4.	Alhaji Shehu Abubakar Yusuf		-	from 		2007-2013
5.	Alhaji Muhammad Isah Umar		-	from		2013-up to date
  
The district head have 31 village heads and 128 ward head working under them, the area has existed for more than 250 years, the major district tribe dominating the area are the Fulani, and while their marriage and other culture behaviour is based on Islamic principle. Since the present of the area are mostly 98% Muslim by religion.

The General Economy 
     
The area is occupied with about 75% are farmers their farming activities constitute the production of consumable goods and cash crops, while the remaining 25% of the population are civil servants, blacksmiths, trader tailors, drivers.

   
The people have opportunity of cultivating twice a year, i.e. rainy and dry season, the draining season farming they plant guinea corn, millet, maize, beans, soya beans, cassava, and others. While for dry season they cultivated the following tomatoes, onion, carrots, water melon, cucumbers, cabbage, potatoes e.t.c see from the book of history and culture of Bunkure local government area.

Local Government Areas in Kano State